Nicolás Álvarez may refer to:

 Nicolás Álvarez (footballer) (born 1990), Argentine footballer
 Nicolás Álvarez (tennis) (born 1996), Peruvian tennis player